Martin Pedersen (born 15 June 1987) is a former professional Danish tennis player. He played predominantly on the ATP Challenger Tour, both in doubles and singles.

Pedersen started playing professionally in 2005, and won his first Futures tournament in Norway in June 2007. He followed the win by reaching a final in yet another Norwegian Futures, as well as reaching the final of a Challenger tournament in Dublin in July. These achievements made him reach his career-best ranking of World No. 344 on 12 May 2008. He announced his retirement in early 2010. 

Pedersen also played in the Denmark Davis Cup team.

ATP Challenger and ITF Futures finals

Singles: 9 (3–6)

Doubles: 11 (5–6)

External links 
 Personal website 
 
 
 

1987 births
Living people
Danish male tennis players
21st-century Danish people